John C. Williams may refer to:
 John C. Williams (economist) (born 1962), American economist and central banker
 John Carvell Williams (1821–1907), English nonconformist campaigner and Member of Parliament for Nottingham South and Mansfield
 John Charles Williams (1861–1939), English Member of Parliament for Truro
 John Charles Williams (cricketer), English cricketer
 John Charles Williams (priest) (1912–2002), British Anglican priest
 John Chester Williams (born 1953), American archer
 John Christopher Williams (born 1941), Australian classical guitarist
 John Constantine Williams Sr. (died 1892), co-founder of St. Petersburg, Florida
 John Cornelius Williams Jr. (born 1938), American politician

See also 
 John Williams (disambiguation)